The Trident is a restaurant in Sausalito, California, originally opened in 1966 as a bar-restaurant-music venue by the Kingston Trio, and noted for its psychedelic murals dating to the 1960s, and its ties to the music counterculture of that era. 
The modern version of the Tequila Sunrise cocktail was invented by Trident bartenders Bobby Lozoff and Billy Rice in the early 1970s. In 1972, at a private party at the Trident organized by Bill Graham to kick off the Rolling Stones' 1972 tour in America, Mick Jagger had one of the cocktails, liked it, and he and his entourage started drinking them. They later ordered them all across America, even dubbing the tour itself their "cocaine and tequila sunrise tour".

During the summers of 1974, 1975 and 1976, Robin Williams worked as a dishwasher and busboy at The Trident.

The Trident closed in 1976; in 1980, the restaurant was renamed Horizons, and became a popular tourist destination, until 2012, when it resumed its Trident title. The current owners also operate the Buena Vista Cafe in San Francisco. The restaurant is located in the former 1898 home of the San Francisco Yacht Club.

References

External links
Trident Restaurant website (current incarnation)

1966 establishments in California
Restaurants established in 1966
Restaurants in the San Francisco Bay Area
Buildings and structures in Marin County, California